Kedambadi Jagannath Shetty was an eminent Jurist and a retired Judge of Karnataka High Court, India.

He breathed his last on 12 February 2016 after prolonged illness.  He is survived by his son and daughter.

Commission of Inquiry
He was the head of two commission of inquiries instituted by the Government of Karnataka, India.

1. Justice Kedambady Jagannatha Shetty Commission of Inquiry on Bhatkal Communal Riots.

2. Justice Kedambady Jagannatha Shetty Commission of Inquiry on Haveri Police Firing.

References 

Living people
People from Dakshina Kannada district
20th-century Indian judges
Tulu people
Mangaloreans
Judges of the Karnataka High Court
Year of birth missing (living people)